Creamed corn (which is also known by other names, such as cream style sweet corn) is a type of creamed vegetable dish made by combining pieces of whole sweetcorn with a soupy liquid of milky residue from pulped corn kernels scraped from the cob. Originating in Native American cuisine, it is now most commonly eaten in the Midwestern and Southern United States, as well as being used in the French Canadian dish pâté chinois ('Chinese pie': a dish like shepherd's pie). It is a soupy version of sweetcorn, and unlike other preparations of sweetcorn, creamed corn is partially puréed, releasing the liquid contents of the kernels.

Additional ingredients 
Canned cream corn does not usually contain any cream, but some homemade versions may include milk or cream. Sugar and starch may also be added. Commercial, store-bought canned preparations may contain tapioca starch as a thickener.

Gallery

See also
 Corn soup
 Corn stew
Corn chowder
Cream soup
 Grits
 Creamed corn cornbread
 List of maize dishes
 List of soups

References

External links
Cream corn at NY Times Diner's Journal Blog

Canned food
Native American cuisine
Dishes featuring sweet corn
Thanksgiving food
American vegetable dishes

Cuisine of the Midwestern United States
Cuisine of the Southern United States